The American Copper Buildings (originally known as 626 First Avenue) are a pair of luxury residential skyscrapers in the Murray Hill neighborhood of Manhattan in New York City. The buildings were developed by JDS Development and were designed by SHoP Architects with interiors by SHoP and K&Co. The buildings are one of several major collaborations between JDS and SHoP; others include 111 West 57th Street, also in Manhattan, and The Brooklyn Tower in Brooklyn.

History
The site the two towers occupy was originally a lot that hosted the Consolidated Edison Kips Bay generating station. The lot was one of three parcels purchased by Sheldon Solow (along with the former Consolidated Edison Waterside power plant on the east side of First Avenue from 38th to 41st streets) and was planned to be redeveloped as part of a seven-tower, $4 billion complex designed by Skidmore, Owings & Merrill. The SOM plan would also have included a park and a public school, as well as an adjacent public space designed by American architect Richard Meier.

Solow sold the southwest corner of the lot in 2010 to the New York City School Construction Authority for $33.25 million, which was used to build P.S. 281 - The River School. He later sold the remaining plot on 35th Street to JDS and Largo in 2013 for $172 million. JDS and Largo secured a loan from Cornerstone Real Estate Advisors to purchase the land. Following a ULURP, Solow changed his plans to a twin-tower structure, which JDS followed per the zoning, although with a new architect. JDS executives were attracted to the lot in part due to the waterfront location and proximity to the United Nations and Langone Medical Center.

Construction began on the site in mid-2014, and the copper cladding was first applied in mid-2015. The west and east towers topped out in late 2015 and early 2016, respectively, and installation of the skybridge between the two towers began in January 2016. The official name of the towers - The American Copper Buildings - was released in April 2016 as the property launched initial leasing efforts. In December 2016, the project received a $500 million senior mortgage from American International Group along with a $160 million mezzanine loan from Apollo Global Management and SL Green Realty.

The two separate structures opened in phases for renters, with American Copper West opening in April 2017 and American Copper East in late 2018. A cafe called Hole in the Wall opened in the base of the east tower in June 2019.

Sale
JDS and Baupost entered into contract to sell the property to investors Black Spruce Management and Orbach Affordable Housing Solutions in December 2021. The sale price was approximately $850 million. The high price has been interpreted as indicative of broader investor confidence in the recovery of New York City despite the ongoing COVID-19 pandemic. JPMorgan provided $675 million in financing to Black Spruce and Orbach.

Design and construction

The north and south elevations of the building's facade are clad in copper, while the east and west elevations are floor to ceiling glass. The two towers are designed such that they appear to "dance" with each other. They are  connected by a bridge approximately 300 feet from the ground, three levels in height. The west tower is 540 feet in height, and the east tower is 470 feet tall.

Facade 
The copper exterior was left as a live material to encourage oxidation, and the structures will eventually change color entirely, from a bright, shiny material, into a darker brown, and finally green. The architect used the copper facade for texture and added variation by staggering the panels in patterns that emanate from the skybridge.  The facade was installed by the Elicc Group.

Skybridge 

The two towers are connected by a three-story skybridge on floors 27, 28, and 29, which includes a portion of the project's 60,000 square feet of amenities such as a 75-foot lap pool, and lounge for residents. The skybridge also includes a mechanical floor used by both towers for efficiency, creating space for the east tower's roof deck pool and lounge. Atop the skybridge are private outdoor terraces attached to adjacent apartments. According to the developers, it is the first such bridge constructed in Manhattan in eighty years.

The bridge structure is composed of steel trusses that weigh up to 421,000 pounds. Measuring 100 feet long, the skybridge is clad in glass that contains an aluminum mesh interlayer that reduces solar gain and gives the appearance from the exterior as an opaque material.

The skybridge was furnished by design firm K&Co.

Resilience
While the buildings’ parcel was for sale during Hurricane Sandy, rainfall turned an onsite pit into a "small lake". The buildings were therefore developed with precautions against floods and extreme weather caused by climate change. In the event of power loss caused by a storm, there are five emergency generators to power the buildings’ eight passenger and two freight elevators and to provide power to tenants’ refrigerators and a single outlet in each apartment for an indefinite period of time.

Architectural choices were also informed by potential floods.

Usage
The buildings are residential, and include 761 rental units. Twenty percent of the units in the two towers are designated affordable, with the remaining eighty percent available at market.

Each tower includes its own lobby with 25-foot ceilings, custom lighting, and wood paneling. Apartments range from studios to three bedrooms. Finishes include oak flooring, light fixtures designed by the architect, Miele appliances, marble countertops and backsplashes in kitchens, and “crocodile” marble accent shower walls.

Amenities
The bridge connecting the development's two towers includes a pool, whirlpool, and a lounge for residents. The building includes a gym, a landscaped plaza, and other amenities. An outdoor pool and lounge are on the top of the east tower, with the top of the west tower reserved for mechanical space.

Reception and awards 
The project has been praised by architecture critics for moving away from all glass design to embrace texture, depth, and character.

Best Tall Building – Americas, 2018, Council for Tall Buildings and Urban Habitat Tall Buildings Awards. 

ASLA-NY 2019 Awards for the First Avenue Water Plaza, category General Landscape Architecture Design, to SCAPE Landscape Architecture.

See also
Inclined building

References

External links
 

2017 establishments in New York City
Inclined buildings
Murray Hill, Manhattan
Residential buildings completed in 2017
Residential skyscrapers in Manhattan
Apartment buildings in New York City